Military rebellion may refer to:
Coup d'état, an illegal deposition of a government
Pronunciamiento, a form of military rebellion or coup d'état peculiar to Spain and the Spanish American republics